Calverton is an unincorporated community and census-designated place (CDP) in Fauquier County, Virginia, United States. The population as of the 2010 census was 239. The village runs along Virginia State Route 28 and its crossroad, Bristersburg Road. Calverton has a Southern States store, a small country store, and post office. Its ZIP code is 20138.

The Calverton Historic District was listed on the National Register of Historic Places in 2010.

Calverton may have been named after Calvert County, Maryland. Gilbert Bastable's family moved to the Warrenton Junction area from Maryland between 1850 and 1860, and Bastable lived in Calvert County prior to returning to Virginia after the Civil War.

Geography
Calverton is located in southeastern Fauquier County, between Catlett to the northeast and Midland to the southwest, all along Virginia Route 28.

Owl Run flows through the center of Calverton; it is a tributary of Cedar Run, part of the Occoquan River watershed flowing to the Potomac River.

Sewage-related problems
The Fauquier County government's vision for Calverton is, "Calverton will be a small rural village centered within an agricultural community. It will be a livable community with a balance of residential and non-residential development surrounded by open space and preserved wildlife." The county established less ambitious goals for Calverton's growth due to the challenges it faced in trying to deal with failed and failing septic drain fields in Calverton by providing public sewers.

References

External links
Virginia Trend Report 2: State and Complete Places (Sub-state 2010 Census Data)

Census-designated places in Fauquier County, Virginia
Census-designated places in Virginia